Jackson Township is one of twelve townships in Buchanan County, Missouri, USA.  As of the 2010 census, its population was 547.

Jackson Township was erected in 1843, and named after President Andrew Jackson.

Geography
It contains three cemeteries: Brinton, Mount Pleasant and Yates.

Benner Lake is within this township.

References

External links
 US-Counties.com
 City-Data.com
 USGS Geographic Names Information System (GNIS)

Townships in Buchanan County, Missouri
Townships in Missouri